The Columbia Lions women's basketball team is the intercollegiate women's basketball program representing Columbia University. The school competes in the Ivy League in Division I of the National Collegiate Athletic Association (NCAA). The Lions play home basketball games at the Levien Gymnasium in New York, New York on the university campus. Columbia has won one Ivy League championship. The team is currently coached by Megan Griffith.

History
Prior to the 2022-23 season, the Lions have a 391-705 record since beginning play in 1984 after Columbia went co-ed in 1983. They joined the Ivy League in women's basketball in 1986 after two seasons in Division III play. The women's teams used to be known as the Barnard Bears, named for the affiliated women's college of the same name. For their first 23 seasons, they never finished higher than fourth in the eight team conference.

 

All-Time Coaching Records

2019- Present
Megan Griffith's tenure as head coach has brought about a marked improvement in the Lions' standing in both the Ivy League conference and overall. In the 2019-20 season, the team qualified for the Ivy League Women's Basketball Tournament for the first time. They finished second in the 2022 Ivy League tournament, losing in the finals to Princeton. In 2022, Columbia began receiving votes in the AP poll for the first time in program history. In 2023, the team won a share of the Ivy League women’s basketball title, also for the first time in program history. On March 17th, 2023, Griffith became the winningest head coach in program history after picking up her 95th career win.

Notable players on the Columbia Women's Basketball roster include junior Abbey Hsu, 2023 Becky Hammon Mid-Major Player of the Year Award Semifinalist and 2022-23 First Team All-Ivy League, and senior Kaitlyn Davis, 2021-22 and 2022-23 First Team All-Ivy League. Both players joined the 1,000-point club in the 2022-23 season, along with senior Sienna Durr, becoming the 12th, 13th, and 14th Lions to do so in program history.

On January 28, 2023, Kaitlyn Davis made history as the first player to ever record a triple-double in Columbia Women's Basketball history.

References

External links